Alma Angela Cohen Cogan (19 May 1932 – 26 October 1966) was an English singer of traditional pop in the 1950s and early 1960s. Dubbed the "Girl with the Giggle in Her Voice", she was the highest paid British female entertainer of her era.

Childhood and early musical career
Cogan was born on 19 May 1932 in Whitechapel, London. She was of Russian-Romanian Jewish descent. Her father's family, the Kogins, arrived in Britain from Russia, while her mother's family were refugees from Romania. Cogan's parents, Mark and Fay Cogan, had another daughter, the actress Sandra Caron, who went on to play "Mumsey" in The Crystal Maze, and one son, Ivor Cogan. Mark's work as a haberdasher entailed frequent moves. One of Cogan's early homes was over his shop in Worthing, Sussex.

Although Jewish, she attended St Joseph's Convent School in Reading. Her father was a singer, but it was Cogan's mother who had showbusiness aspirations for both her daughters (she had named Cogan after silent screen star Alma Taylor). Cogan first performed in public at a charity show at the Palace Theatre in Reading, and at the age of eleven, competed in the "Sussex Queen of Song" contest held at a Brighton hotel, winning a prize of £5.

Aged 14, she was recommended by Vera Lynn for a variety show at the Grand Theatre in Brighton and in July 1947 she appeared there for a week with Max Miller. In November 1947, she appeared in the show "Dick Turpin's Ride to York" at the Grand, Brighton. At 16, she was told by bandleader, Ted Heath, "You've got a good voice, but you're far too young for this business. Come back in five years' time." Heath would later say: "Letting her go was one of the biggest mistakes of my life." She also found work singing at tea dances, while also studying dress design at Worthing Art College, and was soon appearing as a chorus girl in the musical High Button Shoes at the London Hippodrome in November 1948 and in a revue called Sauce Tartare at the Cambridge Theatre in London in May 1949. She became resident singer at the Cumberland Hotel in London in 1949, where she was spotted by EMI producer Walter Ridley, who became her coach and signed her to HMV.

"Girl with the giggle"
Cogan's first release was "To Be Worthy of You" / "Would You", recorded on her 20th birthday. This led to her appearing regularly on comedian Dick Bentley's BBC's radio show Gently Bentley, and then becoming the vocalist for the BBC Radio comedy programme Take It From Here, replacing Joy Nichols, from 1953 to the end of its run in 1960.

In 1953, whilst in the middle of recording "If I Had a Golden Umbrella", she broke into a giggle; she then played up the effect on later recordings. Soon enough, she was dubbed the "Girl with the giggle in her voice". ("Giggle" has sometimes been quoted as "chuckle".)

Many of her recordings were covers of U.S. hits, especially those recorded by Rosemary Clooney, Teresa Brewer, Georgia Gibbs, Joni James and Dinah Shore. Her voice was often compared with Doris Day's. One of these covers, "Bell Bottom Blues", became her first hit, reaching no. 4 on 3 April 1954. Cogan would appear in the UK Singles Chart eighteen times in the 1950s, with "Dreamboat" reaching no. 1. Other hits from this period include "I Can't Tell a Waltz from a Tango", "Why Do Fools Fall in Love", "Sugartime" and "The Story of My Life". Cogan's first album, I Love to Sing, was released in 1958.

Cogan was one of the first UK recording artists to appear frequently on television, where her powerful voice could be showcased along with her bubbly personality and dramatic costumes. Her hooped skirts with sequins and figure-hugging tops were reputedly designed by herself and never worn twice. Cliff Richard recalls: "My first impression of her was definitely frocks – I kept thinking, how many can this woman have? Almost every song had a different costume. The skirts seemed to be so wide – I don't know where they hung them up!" Cogan topped the annual NME reader's poll as "Outstanding British Female Singer" four times between 1956 and 1960.

Too square for the 1960s

The UK musical revolution of the 1960s, symbolised by the rise of the Beatles, suddenly made Cogan unfashionable; in the 1991 BBC documentary Alma Cogan: The Girl with the Giggle in Her Voice, Lionel Blair said she was perceived as "square". Her highest 1960s chart ranking in the UK was no. 26 with "We Got Love", and most of her successes at this time were abroad, notably in Sweden and Japan. She was especially disappointed that her 1963 cover of the Exciters' US hit "Tell Him" did not return her to the UK charts, according to singer Eddie Grassham. In 1964, Cogan recorded "Tennessee Waltz" in a rock-and-roll ballad style; this version was no. 1 in Sweden for five weeks in the best selling chart "Kvällstoppen" and number 1 for no less than 8 weeks in the Swedish Voting Chart "Tio i Topp". Tennessee Waltz also reached the top 20 in Denmark, while a German language rendering reached no. 10 in Germany. She had another number one hit in Sweden in 1965, "The Birds and the Bees". Already the year before, 1963, she had had success in Sweden when her "Tell him" became a hit. It spent seven weeks in the best selling record chart "Kvällstoppen" and peaked at #10. When she in the mid-1960's toured around Sweden with popular local pop bands, whose members were some ten years younger than her, she got the playful nickname "popmormor" (pop-grandmother).

Cogan also wrote some of her own songs. She co-wrote her 1963 record "Just Once More" (under the pseudonym of "Al Western") with her long-time pianist Stan Foster; her 1964 record "It's You" was also a Cogan-Foster collaboration, although this time she was credited under her own name. "Just Once More" peaked at no. 10 in the Swedish Voting Chart "Tio i Topp" in October 1963.

She continued to be a popular figure on the UK showbusiness scene, being offered the part of Nancy in Oliver!, appearing on the teenage hit-show Ready Steady Go!, and headlining at the Talk of the Town.

Personal life
Cogan lived with her widowed mother in Kensington High Street (at 44 Stafford Court) in a lavishly decorated ground-floor flat where she frequently entertained other celebrities. Regular visitors included: Princess Margaret, Noël Coward, Cary Grant, Audrey Hepburn, Michael Caine, Frankie Vaughan, Bruce Forsyth and Roger Moore.

John Lennon once recalled that, when he was a teenager, he used to mimic her savagely during his time at the Liverpool College of Art. Lennon's wife Cynthia also recalled, "John and I had thought of Alma [as] out of date and unhip." But after Lennon actually met Cogan on the TV pop show Ready Steady Go! in 1964, they became close friends, so much so that Cogan's sister Sandra later said that the pair had a serious romance that had to be kept secret because of Alma's family's strict Jewish faith. 

Cogan was close to the other Beatles as well, especially Paul McCartney, who first played the melody of "Yesterday" on her piano; he also played tambourine on her recording of "I Knew Right Away".

Illness and death
Cogan tried to update her image by recording some Beatles numbers and a spin-off from The Man from U.N.C.L.E. ("Love Ya Illya"). But by 1965 record producers were becoming dissatisfied with Cogan's work, and it was clear that her health was failing. Her friend and colleague Anne Shelton attributed this decline to some 'highly experimental' injections she took to lose weight, claiming that Cogan was never well again after that.

Cogan embarked on a series of club dates in the North of England in early 1966, but collapsed after two performances and had to be treated for stomach cancer. She made her final TV appearance in August, on the guest-spot of International Cabaret. The following month she collapsed while touring Sweden to promote Hello Baby, recorded exclusively for the Swedish market. She died of ovarian cancer at London's Middlesex Hospital on 26 October, at the age of 34.

In deference to family custom, her death was observed with traditional Jewish rites, with burial at the Jewish Cemetery in Bushey, Hertfordshire.

Legacy
The novel Alma Cogan by Gordon Burn presents an imaginary middle-aged Cogan looking back on life and fame in the 1980s. It claimed to be based on true events and real people, except for her early death, and won the Whitbread Book Award in 1991. Partly adapted from this novel was the BBC Radio 4 series Stage Mother, Sequinned Daughter (2002) by Annie Caulfield. Cogan's sister Sandra felt that it misrepresented both Cogan and her mother, and tried unsuccessfully to get it banned. Eventually the Broadcasting Standards Commission ruled that the BBC apologise to Sandra for failing to respect the feelings of the surviving family members.

The romantic comedy In Love with Alma Cogan is a film starring Roger Lloyd-Pack. He is an aging manager of an old-fashioned Pier Theatre. It leads to a flashback to his encounter with Alma Cogan, who performed at the theatre in his youth.

A blue plaque commemorating Cogan was installed by the entrance of 44 Stafford Court, her longtime residence, on 4 November 2001.

Discography

Biography
Alma Cogan: The Girl With The Laugh In Her Voice by Sandra Caron (Alma's sister) –

References

1932 births
1966 deaths
Burials in Hertfordshire
Deaths from cancer in England
Deaths from ovarian cancer
English Jews
English people of Romanian-Jewish descent
People from Stepney
RCA Victor artists
Traditional pop music singers
People educated at St Joseph's Convent School
English people of Russian-Jewish descent
20th-century English singers
People from Whitechapel
People from Worthing
20th-century English women singers